Melissa Adams (born December 16, 1977 in Grand Falls, New Brunswick as Melissa McClure) is a Canadian curler from Hanwell, New Brunswick. She is a former Canadian and World Junior champion skip. She is currently the alternate on Team Jaclyn Crandall.

Career

Juniors
Adams first national championship appearance was at the 1995 Canada Winter Games where she played for New Brunswick, winning a bronze medal. She also won two New Brunswick High School championships in 1993 and 1994. Adams would then go on to skip New Brunswick at three straight Canadian Junior Curling Championships. At the 1996 Canadian Junior Curling Championships, Adams led her New Brunswick team of Nancy Toner, Brigitte McClure and Bethany Toner to a 6–6 round robin record, missing the playoffs. At the 1997 Canadian Junior Curling Championships, she led her team to an improved 7–5 record, but again missed the playoffs. At the 1998 Canadian Junior Curling Championships, she led her team to a 10–2 round robin record, good enough for second place. In the semifinals, she beat Prince Edward Island's Suzanne Gaudet rink and then in the finals, she beat Ontario's Jenn Hanna to claim the championship. Adams would then represent Canada at the 1998 World Junior Curling Championships. There, she led her team to a 7–2 round robin record, in second place. In the semifinals, she beat Scotland's Julia Ewart rink, and then downed Japan's Akiko Katoh rink in the final to win the gold medal.

Women's
Adams has had less success in her post-junior career. She would not win a provincial women's championship until 2017 with teammates Jennifer Armstrong, Cathlia Ward and Katie Forward. They represented New Brunswick at the 2017 Scotties Tournament of Hearts, where they failed to make it out of the pre-qualifying tournament. After going 3–0 in the tournament, she lost in the pre-qualifying final to the Northwest Territories, and did not play in the main event. The next season, Adams joined the Sylvie Robichaud rink, which would win the 2018 New Brunswick Scotties Tournament of Hearts. At the 2018 Scotties Tournament of Hearts, the team finished the new pool play format with a 4–3 record. This placed them fifth in their pool, not enough to qualify for the Championship Pool. In addition to her appearances at the 2017 and 2018 Hearts, Adams was the alternate for Team New Brunswick (skipped by Andrea Kelly) at the 2009 Scotties Tournament of Hearts, though she did not play in any games.

On the World Curling Tour, Adams has played in one career Grand Slam event, the 2010 Sobeys Slam, losing all three of her games. She has won the WFG Jim Sullivan Curling Classic twice, in 2015 and 2017.

After failing to win the provincial championship in back to back years, Team Quillian disbanded and Adams formed her own team of Justine Comeau, Jaclyn Tingley and Kendra Lister. Due to the COVID-19 pandemic in New Brunswick, the 2021 provincial championship was cancelled. As the reigning provincial champions, Team Crawford was given the invitation to represent New Brunswick at the 2021 Scotties Tournament of Hearts, but they declined due to work and family commitments. Team Adams was then invited in their place, which they accepted. One member of Adams' rink, Justine Comeau, opted to not attend the Scotties, with Nicole Arsenault Bishop stepping in to play second on the team. At the Hearts, Adams led her team to a 3–5 round robin record, failing to qualify for the championship round.

Mixed doubles
Adams plays mixed doubles curling with her partner Alex Robichaud. The duo won the 2019 Goldine Clermont Mixed Doubles on the World Curling Tour. In 2021, the pair represented New Brunswick at the 2021 Canadian Mixed Doubles Curling Championship, finishing with a 1–5 record.

Personal life
Adams is married to Todd Adams and has three children. She works as the national operations specialist for the Canadian Food Inspection Agency.

Her junior team was inducted into the New Brunswick Sports Hall of Fame in 2004.

References

External links

1977 births
Canadian women curlers
Curlers from New Brunswick
Living people
People from Grand Falls, New Brunswick
People from York County, New Brunswick